Badiaria is a genus of moths of the family Tortricidae.

Species
Badiaria plagiata Razowski & Wojtusiak, 2008
Badiaria plagiostrigata Razowski & Wojtusiak, 2006

Etymology
The name refers to brownish background colour of the wings of the type species and is derived from Latin badius (meaning brown).

See also
List of Tortricidae genera

References

External links
tortricidae.com

Euliini
Tortricidae genera